Saattai Illatha Pambaram is a 1983 Indian Tamil-language film directed and edited by Erode N. Murugesh. The film stars Sivakumar and Saritha. It was released on 14 April 1983.

Plot

Cast 
 Sivakumar as Palanisamy
 Saritha as Jaya
 Cho Ramaswamy as Dharmalingam
 Sangili Murugan as Muthu
 Ganthimathi as Pottikadai Ayyamma
 Ayyakannu as Manager

Soundtrack 
The soundtrack was composed by Ilaiyaraaja.

Reception 
Jeyamanmadhan of Kalki gave the film a negative review.

References

External links 
 

1980s Tamil-language films
1983 films
Films scored by Ilaiyaraaja
Films with screenplays by K. Bhagyaraj